Partizan may refer to:

Sport
JSD Partizan, a sports society from Belgrade, Serbia, which includes the following clubs:
AK Partizan, athletics
Biciklistički Klub Partizan, cycling
Džudo Klub Partizan, judo
FK Partizan, association football
FK Partizan Academy, the club's youth school
Partizan Stadium, the club's stadium
HK Partizan, ice hockey
Karate Klub Partizan, karate
KK Partizan, basketball
OK Partizan, volleyball
ŽOK Partizan, women's volleyball
Ragbi Klub Partizan, rugby
RK Partizan, handball
Rvački Klub Partizan, wrestling
Plivački Klub Partizan, swimming
Streljački Klub Partizan, shooting
Tekvondo Klub Partizan, taekwondo
Veslački Klub Partizan, rowing
VK Partizan, water polo
ŽKK Partizan, women basketball
RK Partizan Bjelovar, former name of RK Bjelovar, a Croatian teem handball club
FC Partizan (disambiguation)
FK Partizan (disambiguation)
NK Partizan (disambiguation)
Partizán Bardejov, Slovak association football team from Bardejov
TJ Partizán Domaniža, Slovak association football team from Domaniža

Places
Partizan Island, an island in Antarctica
Partizan (rural locality), several rural localities in Russia
Partizan Fjord, in Severnaya Zemlya, Krasnoyarsk Krai, Russia

Companies
Partizan Press, a UK-based publisher of military history
Partizan Midi-Minuit, a French company which produces videos
Prvi Partizan, Serbian ammunition manufacturer

Other
Partizan, a term for a partisan used in several Slavic languages
Partizan, a variant spelling of partisan, a polearm weapon used in Medieval Europe
Partizan (band), a Romanian alternative rock band

See also
Partizani (disambiguation)
Partisan (disambiguation)
Partisan game (or partizan game), in combinatorial game theory, a game that is not impartial